Letters from the Fire was an American hard rock band from San Francisco, California founded in 2012.

History

Beginnings (2012–2016)
Carley Coma, of Candiria, released an EP with Letters from the fire. He also toured with them in 2012.

In 2014, Letters from the Fire debut their first commercial EP with a cover of the Beatles' "Eleanor Rigby", which ranked No. 41 on Active Rock Radio as well as a music video for "Zombies in the Sun", which hit No. 31 on the American Mediabase Activerock charts. Following national tours with Pop Evil and Trapt, Letters from the Fire and Elliot Weber (former vocalist) decided to part ways because of artistic differences.

Worth the Pain (2016–2017)
In May 2016, the band released "Give In to Me", the first single from Worth the Pain, the debut studio album from the group. Produced by Kile Odell, Worth the Pain released worldwide on September 9, 2016. In December 2016, the ensemble released a lyric video for "Control" and a music video for the title track, "Worth the Pain".

The band toured with Lacey Sturm in February 2017, and performed throughout the United States alongside Adelitas Way in March 2017. In May, July and August 2017, the ensemble plans to travel throughout North America to open for Seether with dates accompanying Black Stone Cherry from late May until the middle of June 2017. On May 31, 2017, the band published a music video for the song "At War".

Letters from the Fire and breakup (2017–2019)
In late August 2017, Keller announced that the ensemble plans to work on their second studio album. Almost two months later, Kabazie and Sumwalt parted ways with the group, announcing Nina Bergman as the new lead vocalist and Seth Hostetter as their new drummer. Two weeks later, the group announced that they would begin recording in December 2017 with producer Colin Brittain.

On April 1, 2018, Bergman announced that "Comfort You", the first single from Letters from the Fire, their self-titled second studio album, which was released on April 13, 2018. On April 13, 2018, the group announced that the album would be released on June 15, 2018. At that time, the group toured the United States with electronicore band Palisades.

Between late 2018 and late 2019, Letters from the Fire broke up.

Members

Current
 Mike Keller – rhythm guitar 
 Cameron Stucky – lead guitar 
 Clayton Wages – bass 
 Nina Bergman – vocals 
 Seth Hostetter – drums

Former
 Carley Coma - vocals 
 Brian Sumwalt – drums 
 Alexa Kabazie – vocals 
 Elliot Weber – vocals

Discography

Studio albums

EPs
Rebirth (2012)
Letters from the Fire (2014)

Singles

Music videos
 "Zombies in the Sun"
 "Give In to Me"
 "Control"
 "Worth the Pain"
 "At War"
 "Comfort You"

References

Hard rock musical groups from California
Musical groups from San Francisco